Åsvær Lighthouse is a coastal lighthouse in Dønna Municipality in Nordland county, Norway.

The original lighthouse was replaced in 1919 after a tough winter storm. The new lighthouse was automated in 1980, and it was listed as a protected site in 2000.

The light emits a white, red or green light depending on direction, occulting in groups of two every eight seconds.

See also

Lighthouses in Norway
List of lighthouses in Norway

References

External links
Norsk Fyrhistorisk Forening 

Lighthouses completed in 1876
Lighthouses completed in 1919
Lighthouses in Nordland
Dønna
Listed lighthouses in Norway